Mala Kunia (2014) is a mini-album and roughly the 140th release by electronic music group Tangerine Dream. Violinist Hoshiko Yamane is not credited on this release.

Overview
Mala Kunia was released as a limited edition on occasion of the Australian concerts in late 2014. The album features seven new compositions, including two which were co-composed by new band member Ulrich Schnauss together with Edgar Froese.

With this release a new Tangerine Dream era was started, "The Quantum Years", which focuses on a more back to basics approach to composition influenced by quantum physics.

This album is named for the name of two Aboriginal tribesaccording to Aboriginal mythologyliving ages ago around Uluru, also known as Ayers Rock, whereas the Mala tribe lived on the sunny side and the Kunia on the shady side of the rock.

The first 100 orders shipped of this release came with a photo postcard signed by all four members of the band.

Track listing
All compositions by Edgar Froese, except where indicated.
 "Shadow And Sun"  – 7:54 (Edgar Froese, Ulrich Schnauss) 
 "Madagaskunia"  – 6:51
 "Madagasmala"  – 7:04 (Edgar Froese, Ulrich Schnauss) 
 "Beyond Uluru" – 7:49 
 "Vision of the Blue Birds" - 8:39 
 "Snake Men's Dance at Dawn" - 5:51 
 "Power of the Rainbow Serpent" - 8:03 (Thorsten Quaeschning)

Personnel
Tangerine Dream
Edgar Froese 
Thorsten Quaeschning 
Ulrich Schnauss

References

External links

Tangerine Dream albums
2014 albums